Alibaba A 40 Krátkych Songov is the sixth album by the Slovak punk rock/comedy rock band Horkýže Slíže, released in November 2003. The album title translates literally into English as "Alibaba and 40 short songs". It includes songs that are no longer than 90 seconds (with an exception of "Atómový Kryt" and "Banda Tupých Hláv", both of which were singles and had their own official music videos recorded).

Track list

Personnel
 Peter Hrivňák (Kuko) – vocals, bass guitar
 Mário Sabo (Sabotér) – guitar, backing vocals
 Juraj Štefánik (Doktor) – guitar, backing vocals
 Marek Viršík (Vandel) – drums, backing vocals

Guests
 Lapášanka (tracks 1, 29)
 Peter Bohm (tracks 2, 6)
 Roman Slávik (tracks 4, 6, 20, 38, 39)
 Kristína Belčíková (track 5)
 Erik Knotek (track 39)
 Sanchez (tracks 11, 20, 38)
 Gréta (tracks 20, 25, 39, 40)
 Lívia (tracks 1, 25)
 Emil (track 1)
 Laco Senior (track 1)
 Laco Junior (track 34)
 Dedi, detičky a Jana Sláviková (track 36)

2003 albums
Horkýže Slíže albums